Karl or Carl August Görner (29 January 1806, in Berlin – 9 April 1884, in Hamburg) was a German actor, director and playwright.

1806 births
1884 deaths
German male stage actors
German theatre directors
Male actors from Berlin
Writers from Berlin
19th-century German male actors
German male dramatists and playwrights
19th-century German dramatists and playwrights
19th-century German male writers
19th-century theatre managers